Brian Stephen Howser (February 8, 1975 – August 18, 1998), known by his ring name Shane Shamrock, was an American professional wrestler best known for his time Maryland Championship Wrestling. He is the only wrestler to win the Light Heavyweight Champion in the company's history, having become the inaugural champion two months before his death.

Career
Howser took his ring name of "Shane Shamrock" as a tribute to his adopted father, Bob Shamrock. He wrestled in independent promotions including Mid-Eastern Wrestling Federation, but is likely best known for his time in Maryland Championship Wrestling. During his time in MCW, he won the Light Heavyweight Championship in a 6-way match on July 19, 1998.

Death
Howser died at the age of 23 on August 18, 1998, after being fatally shot by police during an altercation at his Glen Burnie, Maryland, home. Officers were responding to a 9-1-1 call from his girlfriend after Howser allegedly threatened to stab her with a kitchen knife. Howser was then shot and killed by responding officers after refusing to drop the weapon. He was posthumously named "The Lifetime MCW Light Heavyweight Champion" until the organization retired the title a month later.

Championships and accomplishments
Maryland Championship Wrestling
MCW Light Heavyweight Championship (1 time, First & Final)

See also
 List of premature professional wrestling deaths

References

External links
Bodyslam profile
Cagematch profile

1975 births
1998 deaths
20th-century professional wrestlers
American male professional wrestlers
Sportspeople from Baltimore
People shot dead by law enforcement officers in the United States
Professional wrestlers from Maryland
Deaths by firearm in Maryland